Latkova Vas ( or) is a village in the Municipality of Prebold in east-central Slovenia. It lies on the right bank of the Savinja River north of Prebold. The area is part of the traditional region of Styria and is included in the Savinja Statistical Region.

References

External links

Latkova Vas at Geopedia

Populated places in the Municipality of Prebold